Gong Peak is a mountain located in the Sunwapta River Valley of Jasper National Park in Alberta, Canada. The peak lies three km southeast of Mount Weiss. The mountain was named in 1919 by the Interprovincial Boundary Survey after nearby Gong Lake.

References

Three-thousanders of Alberta
Winston Churchill Range
Mountains of Jasper National Park